Src kinase-associated phosphoprotein 2 is an enzyme that in humans is encoded by the SKAP2 gene.

Function 

The protein encoded by this gene belongs to the src family kinases. This protein is similar to the src kinase associated phosphoprotein 1. It is an adaptor protein that is thought to play an essential role in the src signaling pathway in various cells, but particularly specific in macrophages.  It inhibits PTK2B/RAFTK activity and regulates alpha-synuclein phosphorylation.  It interacts with Signal-regulatory protein alpha and directs integrin-activated cytoskeletal reorganization in macrophages.

References

Further reading